The 1975 San Francisco Giants season was the Giants' 93rd season in Major League Baseball, their 18th season in San Francisco since their move from New York following the 1957 season, and their 16th at Candlestick Park. The team finished in third place in the National League West with an 80–81 record, 27½ games behind the Cincinnati Reds.

Offseason 
 October 14, 1974: Ken Rudolph and Elías Sosa were traded by the Giants to the St. Louis Cardinals for Marc Hill.
 October 22, 1974: Bobby Bonds was traded by the Giants to the New York Yankees for Bobby Murcer.
 December 6, 1974: Tito Fuentes and Butch Metzger were traded by the Giants to the San Diego Padres for Derrel Thomas.
 January 29, 1975: Von Joshua was selected off waivers by the Giants from the Los Angeles Dodgers.

Regular season

Season standings

Record vs. opponents

Opening Day starters 
Jim Barr
Garry Maddox
Gary Matthews
Bobby Murcer
Steve Ontiveros
Dave Rader
Chris Speier
Derrel Thomas
Gary Thomasson

Notable transactions 
 April 3, 1975: Chuck Hartenstein was released by the Giants.
 May 4, 1975: Garry Maddox was traded by the Giants to the Philadelphia Phillies for Willie Montañez.

Roster

Player stats

Batting

Starters by position 
Note: Pos = Position; G = Games played; AB = At bats; H = Hits; Avg. = Batting average; HR = Home runs; RBI = Runs batted in

Other batters 
Note: G = Games played; AB = At bats; H = Hits; Avg. = Batting average; HR = Home runs; RBI = Runs batted in

Pitching

Starting pitchers 
Note: G = Games pitched; IP = Innings pitched; W = Wins; L = Losses; ERA = Earned run average; SO = Strikeouts

Other pitchers 
Note: G = Games pitched; IP = Innings pitched; W = Wins; L = Losses; ERA = Earned run average; SO = Strikeouts

Relief pitchers 
Note: G = Games pitched; W = Wins; L = Losses; SV = Saves; ERA = Earned run average; SO = Strikeouts

Awards and honors 

All-Star Game

Farm system 

LEAGUE CHAMPIONS: Great Falls; LEAGUE CO-CHAMPIONS: Lafayette

References

External links
 1975 San Francisco Giants at Baseball Reference
 1975 San Francisco Giants at Baseball Almanac

San Francisco Giants seasons
San Francisco Giants season
San Fran